Gundal may refer to:

 Gundal och Högås, a locality in Sweden
 Gundal, Ranga Reddy, a village in India